The Myanmar Dental Council (MDC) is a professional association established in 1970 which has more than 4,000 members. The Myanmar Dental Council is formed under the Myanmar Dental Council law (Chapter III) with the approval of the Ministry of Health of Myanmar.

If any registered dental practitioner is desirous of practising the dental services, he shall apply to the council to obtain the general dental practitioner license. Every Myanmar dentists need to submit their license application forms to the Council yearly. The council arranged medical trip to rural areas with active members every year.

Gallery

See also
 Dentistry
 Myanmar Dental Association
 Myanmar Dental Association (Yangon Region)
 University of Dental Medicine, Mandalay
 University of Dental Medicine, Yangon

References

Medical and health organisations based in Myanmar
1970 establishments in Burma
Dental organizations